Dashynka is a village in Zhytomyr Raion of Zhytomyr Oblast of Ukraine.

Geography 
Dashynka is within the boundaries of the natural-geographical region Polissya and 6 km from the district center   - the city Khoroshiv. The nearest train station  - , for 24 km. To the south-east of the village flows the river .

History 
Dashynka was founded in the second half of the XVII century.
In 1906, the village lived 463 people, there were 86 yard farms.
In 1932–1933, the village suffered from the Holodomor. According to eyewitnesses, the number of deaths was at least 20 people.
During the German-Soviet war, 211 local residents took part in hostilities, 121 of them died, 90 were awarded with orders and medals.
In the early 1970s, the central estate of the Zhdanov collective farm, an eight-year school, a club, a library with a book fund of 6759 copies and a paramedic-obstetric station operated in the village.

Population 
According to Population Census of Ukraine 2001, the population of the village was 389 people, of which 99.74% said their native Ukrainian, and 0.26% - Belarusian

Famous people from Dashynka 
 
Ovsiy Grygorovych Levchenko

References

Sources and external links 

 Registration card on the site of Verkhovna Rada of Ukraine
 Web-page of KHOROSHIV COMMUNITY

Volhynian Governorate
Populated places established in the 17th century

Villages in Zhytomyr Raion